Lassie from Lancashire is a 1938 British romantic musical comedy film directed by John Paddy Carstairs and starring Marjorie Browne, Hal Thompson and Marjorie Sandford. It was made by British National Films at Welwyn Studios. 
The film's art direction was by Duncan Sutherland.

Plot
Struggling young actress Jenny (Marjorie Browne) joins her dad (Mark Daly) when he moves into Aunt Hetty's (Elsie Wagstaff) boarding house. Aunt Hetty overworks them, but Jenny is lucky enough to find love in the form of aspiring songwriter Tom (Hal Thompson). But their romance is threatened and nearly destroyed by Margie (Marjorie Sandford), the jealous star actress of the local pierrot troupe. However, the young lovers move on to bigger and better things after winning a London West End theatre contract.

Cast
 Marjorie Browne as Jenny  
 Hal Thompson as Tom  
 Marjorie Sandford as Margie  
 Mark Daly as Dad  
 Vera Lennox as Daisy  
 Elsie Wagstaff as Aunt Hetty  
 Billy Caryll as himself
 Hilda Mundy as herself
 Johnnie Schofield as Cyril 
 Leslie Phillips as Bit Part  
 Anita Sharp-Bolster as Woman in Audience

Critical reception
TV Guide gave the film two out of four stars, calling it "An amusing little romantic comedy."  The Monthly Film Bulletin described the film as "charming little love story [which] is merely the excuse for a number of catchy songs and jokes which are not only funny but clean."

References

Bibliography
 Low, Rachael. Filmmaking in 1930s Britain. George Allen & Unwin, 1985.
 Wood, Linda. British Films, 1927-1939. British Film Institute, 1986.

External links

1938 films
British romantic comedy films
1938 romantic comedy films
Films shot at Welwyn Studios
Films directed by John Paddy Carstairs
Films set in England
Films set in Blackpool
British black-and-white films
1930s English-language films
1930s British films